The Walgreen Drug Store (aka Walgreens) is a historic site in Miami, Florida. It is found at 200 East Flagler Street.

On January 4, 1989, it was added to the U.S. National Register of Historic Places.

References

External links

 Dade County listings at unofficial list of National Register of Historic Places
 Florida's Office of Cultural and Historical Programs
 Dade County listings
 Walgreen Drug Store Building

Buildings and structures in Miami
National Register of Historic Places in Miami
Retail buildings in Florida
Moderne architecture in Florida
Commercial buildings completed in 1936
Commercial buildings on the National Register of Historic Places in Florida